"Perfect" is the debut single of English band Fairground Attraction, written by Mark E. Nevin. Released on 21 March 1988, the single reached number one in the United Kingdom on 14 May 1988, where it stayed for one week. It also reached number one in Australia, Ireland, and South Africa. In the United States, the song peaked at number 80 on the Billboard Hot 100.  "Perfect" won the award for British Single of the Year at the 1989 Brit Awards.

Release
In the UK, "Perfect" was released as a 7-inch single, 12-inch single, and CD single. The song was included on the band's first album, The First of a Million Kisses, released later the same year.  A version of the song with a different singer was used in television advertising for Asda in the late 1980s and early 1990s. It was re-released as a single in 1993 after it had reappeared on the compilation album Celtic Heart.

Track listings

7-inch single
A. "Perfect" – 3:33
B. "Mythology" – 4:30

12-inch and CD single
 "Perfect" – 3:33
 "Falling Backwards" – 2:25
 "Mythology" – 4:30
 "Mystery Train" – 1:40

7-inch single (1993)
A. "Perfect"
B. "Captured"

CD single (1993)
 "Perfect"
 "Walkin' After Midnight"
 "You Send Me"
 "Captured"

Charts

Weekly charts

Year-end charts

Certifications

Baillie & the Boys version

American country music group Baillie & the Boys released their version in April 1990 as the first single from the album The Lights of Home.  The song reached number 23 on the Billboard Hot Country Singles & Tracks chart.

Charts

References

1988 songs
1988 debut singles
1990 singles
Baillie & the Boys songs
Bertelsmann Music Group singles
Brit Award for British Single
Fairground Attraction songs
Irish Singles Chart number-one singles
Number-one singles in Australia
RCA Records singles
Song recordings produced by Kyle Lehning
Songs written by Mark Nevin
UK Singles Chart number-one singles